Magnus Risgaard Jensen (born 27 October 1996) is a Danish football player. He plays for AC Horsens.

Club career
He made his Danish Superliga debut for AC Horsens on 24 February 2020 in a game against AGF.

References

External links
 

1996 births
Living people
Danish men's footballers
Association football defenders
Viborg FF players
Skive IK players
AC Horsens players
Danish 1st Division players
Danish Superliga players